Vikadakumaran is a 2018 Indian Malayalam-language comedy film directed by Boban Samuel and written by Y. V. Rajesh. The film stars Vishnu Unnikrishnan and Manasa Radhakrishnan. It was produced by Arun Ghosh and Bijoy Chandran under the banner of Chand V Creations.

Cast
 Vishnu Unnikrishnan as Advocate Binu Sebastian
 Manasa Radhakrishnan as Sindhu, his love interest
 Dharmajan Bolgatty as Manikandan, Binu's assistant
 Rafi as Magistrate Solomon Mathew Puthanpallil
 Baiju Santhosh as Adv. Sundareshan Nadar aka KD
 Sunil Sukhada as Pappan
 Jinu Joseph as Roshi Balachandran
 Mahesh as Renjith
 Jayan Cherthala as Advocate Harihara Iyyer Swami
 Aruldoss as DSP Paul Raj, Tamil Nadu Police
 Arun Ghosh as C.I Anirudhan
 Indrans as Sukumaran Pillai, Home guard
 Sreeya Remesh as Leela
 Rosin Jolly as Aishwarya Nair, film actress
 Megha Mathew as Adv.Mini
 Nizhalgal Ravi as Tamil Nadu Police Superintendent
 Babu Annur as Anthony
 Devika Nambiar
 Abhilash kottarakkara gunda

Release
Vikadakumaran was released on 29 March 2018 in India.

References

External links
 

2018 films
2018 comedy films
2010s Malayalam-language films
Indian comedy films
Films directed by Boban Samuel